Jana Tichá (born 1965 in České Budějovice) is a Czech astronomer and discoverer of minor planets. She studied at the University of Economics in Prague and graduated in 1987. In 1992 she was selected for the position of a director of the Kleť Observatory.

She specializes in discoveries of asteroids and comets especially near-Earth objects (NEOs). The Minor Planet Center credits her with the discovery of 104 numbered minor planets during 1995–2003. She is the chair of the IAU Committee on Small Body Nomenclature (CSBN), which is responsible for approving names of asteroids. She works together with her husband Miloš Tichý at Kleť.

In her country she is also well known for her popularization activities. She is major contributor to the Czech web servers about asteroids and comets.

On 3 May 1996 the asteroid 5757 Tichá was named in her honour, while she named her discovery, the main-belt asteroid 8307 Peltan, after several members of her family.

List of discovered minor planets

References 
 

  Zdeněk Suchan, Cena Zdeňka Kvíze za rok 2004, in Kosmické rozhledy vol. 6/2004, page 38

External links 
 Staff webpage on the web of the Kleť observatory

1965 births
20th-century astronomers
Czech astronomers
Discoverers of asteroids

Living people
Scientists from České Budějovice